Caroxylon is a genus of shrubby flowering plants in the family Amaranthaceae, found in drier areas of the Old World, including southern Africa, Madagascar, northern Africa, Mediterranean islands of Europe, the Canary Islands, Socotra, Ukraine, Russia, western Asia, Central Asia, India, western and northern China, and Mongolia.

Species
Currently accepted species include:

Caroxylon abarghuense (Assadi) Akhani & Roalson
Caroxylon acocksii (Botsch.) Mucina
Caroxylon adiscum (Botsch.) Mucina
Caroxylon adversariifolium (Botsch.) Mucina
Caroxylon aegaeum (Rech.f.) Akhani & Roalson
Caroxylon aellenii (Botsch.) Mucina
Caroxylon agrigentinum (Guss.) C.Brullo, Brullo, Giusso, Guarino & Iamonico
Caroxylon albidum (Botsch.) Theodorova
Caroxylon albisepalum (Aellen) Mucina
Caroxylon aphyllum (L.f.) Tzvelev
Caroxylon apiciflorum (Botsch.) Mucina
Caroxylon apterygeum (Botsch.) Mucina
Caroxylon arabicum (Botsch.) Akhani & Roalson
Caroxylon araneosum (Botsch.) Akhani & Roalson
Caroxylon arboreum (C.A.Sm. ex Aellen) Mucina
Caroxylon armatum (C.A.Sm. ex Aellen) Mucina
Caroxylon aroabicum (Botsch.) Mucina
Caroxylon atratum (Botsch.) Mucina
Caroxylon barbatum (Aellen) Mucina
Caroxylon caffrum (Sparrm.) Mucina
Caroxylon calluna (Drège ex C.H.Wright) Theodorova ex Mucina
Caroxylon campylopterum (Botsch.) Mucina
Caroxylon carpathum (P.H.Davis) Akhani & Roalson
Caroxylon cauliflorum (Botsch.) Mucina
Caroxylon ceresicum (Botsch.) Mucina
Caroxylon chorassanicum (Botsch.) Akhani & Roalson
Caroxylon columnare (Botsch.) Theodorova
Caroxylon contrariifolium (Botsch.) Mucina
Caroxylon cryptopterum (Aellen) Mucina
Caroxylon cyclophyllum (Baker) Akhani & Roalson
Caroxylon dealatum (Botsch.) Mucina
Caroxylon decussatum (C.A.Sm. ex Botsch.) Mucina
Caroxylon dendroides (Pall.) Tzvelev
Caroxylon denudatum (Botsch.) Mucina
Caroxylon dinteri (Botsch.) Mucina
Caroxylon divaricatum Moq.
Caroxylon dolichostigmum (Botsch.) Mucina
Caroxylon dzhungaricum (Iljin) Akhani & Roalson
Caroxylon ericoides (M.Bieb.) Akhani & Roalson
Caroxylon esterhuyseniae (Botsch.) Mucina
Caroxylon etoshense (Botsch.) Mucina
Caroxylon exalatum (Botsch.) Mucina
Caroxylon forcipitatum (Iljin) Akhani & Roalson
Caroxylon gaetulum (Maire) Akhani & Roalson
Caroxylon garubicum (Botsch.) Mucina
Caroxylon geminiflorum (Fenzl ex C.H.Wright) Mucina
Caroxylon gemmascens (Pall.) Tzvelev
Caroxylon gemmatum (Botsch.) Mucina
Caroxylon gemmiferum  (Botsch.) Mucina
Caroxylon gemmiparum (Botsch.) Mucina
Caroxylon genistoides (Juss. ex Poir.) Pau
Caroxylon giessii (Botsch.) Mucina
Caroxylon glabrescens (Burtt Davy) Akhani & Roalson
Caroxylon glabrum (Botsch.) Mucina
Caroxylon henriciae (I.Verd.) Mucina
Caroxylon hoanibicum (Botsch.) Mucina
Caroxylon hottentotticum (Botsch.) Mucina
Caroxylon huabicum (Botsch.) Mucina
Caroxylon humifusum (C.A.Sm. ex A.E.Brueckner) Theodorova
Caroxylon iljinii (Botsch.) Akhani
Caroxylon imbricatum (Forssk.) Moq.
Caroxylon inapertum (Botsch.) Mucina
Caroxylon incanescens (C.A.Mey.) Akhani & Roalson
Caroxylon inerme (Forssk.) Akhani & Roalson
Caroxylon jordanicola (Eig) Akhani & Roalson
Caroxylon kalaharicum (Botsch.) Mucina
Caroxylon kleinfonteini (Botsch.) Mucina
Caroxylon koichabicum (Botsch.) Mucina
Caroxylon laricinum (Pall.) Tzvelev
Caroxylon littoralis (Moq.) Akhani & Roalson
Caroxylon marginatum (Botsch.) Mucina
Caroxylon melananthum (Botsch.) Mucina
Caroxylon merxmuelleri (Aellen) Mucina
Caroxylon micrantherum (Botsch.) Sukhor.
Caroxylon microtrichum (Botsch.) Mucina
Caroxylon minutifolium (Botsch.) Mucina
Caroxylon mirabile (Botsch.) Mucina
Caroxylon namaqualandicum (Botsch.) Mucina
Caroxylon namibicum (Botsch.) Mucina
Caroxylon nigrescens (C.A.Sm. ex I.Verd.) Mucina
Caroxylon nitrarium (Pall.) Akhani & Roalson
Caroxylon nodulosum Moq.
Caroxylon nollothense (Aellen) Mucina
Caroxylon okaukuejense (Botsch.) Mucina
Caroxylon omaruruense (Botsch.) Mucina
Caroxylon orientale (S.G.Gmel.) Tzvelev
Caroxylon parviflorum (Botsch.) Mucina
Caroxylon passerinum (Bunge) Akhani & Roalson
Caroxylon patentipilosum (Botsch.) Mucina
Caroxylon pearsonii (Botsch.) Mucina
Caroxylon persicum (Bunge ex Boiss.) Akhani & Roalson
Caroxylon phillipsii (Botsch.) Mucina
Caroxylon pillansii (Botsch.) Mucina
Caroxylon procerum (Botsch.) Mucina
Caroxylon ptilopterum (Botsch.) Mucina
Caroxylon pulvinatum (Botsch.) Akhani & Roalson
Caroxylon rabieanum (C.A.Sm. ex I.Verd.) Mucina
Caroxylon robinsonii (Botsch.) Mucina
Caroxylon roshevitzii (Iljin) Akhani & Roalson
Caroxylon ruschii (Aellen) Mucinav
Caroxylon schreiberae (Botsch.) Mucina
Caroxylon scleranthum (C.A.Mey.) Akhani & Roalson
Caroxylon scopiforme (Botsch.) Mucina
Caroxylon seminudum (Botsch.) Mucina
Caroxylon sericatum (Botsch.) Mucina
Caroxylon seydelii (Botsch.) Mucina
Caroxylon smithii (Botsch.) Mucina
Caroxylon spenceri (Botsch.) Mucina
Caroxylon spinescens (Moq.) Akhani & Roalson
Caroxylon squarrosulum (Botsch.) Mucina
Caroxylon stenopterum (Wagenitz) Akhani & Roalson
Caroxylon swakopmundi (Botsch.) Mucina
Caroxylon tetragonum (Delile) Moq.
Caroxylon tetramerum (Botsch.) Mucina
Caroxylon tetrandrum (Forssk.) Akhani & Roalson
Caroxylon tuberculatiforme (Botsch.) Mucina
Caroxylon tuberculatum Moq.
Caroxylon turkestanicum (Litv.) Akhani & Roalson
Caroxylon ugabicum (Botsch.) Mucina
Caroxylon unjabicum (Botsch.) Mucina
Caroxylon verdoorniae (Toelken) Mucina
Caroxylon vermiculatum (L.) Akhani & Roalson
Caroxylon villosum (Schult.) Akhani & Roalson
Caroxylon volkensii (Schweinf. & Asch.) Akhani & Roalson
Caroxylon warmbadicum (Botsch.) Mucina
Caroxylon yazdianum (Assadi) Akhani & Roalson
Caroxylon zeyheri Moq.

References

Amaranthaceae
Amaranthaceae genera